The 1983 London Marathon was the third running of the annual marathon race in London, United Kingdom, which took place on Sunday, 17 April. The elite men's race was won by home athlete Mike Gratton in a time of 2:09:43 hours and the women's race was won by Norway's Grete Waitz in 2:25:29. Waitz's time was a marathon world record, yet it stood for only one day as it was beaten by Joan Benoit at the 1983 Boston Marathon.

Around 60,000 people applied to enter the race, of which 19,735 had their applications accepted and around 16,500 started the race. A total of 15,793 runners finished the race.

A wheelchair race was held for the first time, organised by the British Sports Association for the Disabled, and British athletes Gordon Perry and Denise Smith won the men's and women's divisions, respectively. The race organiser Chris Brasher had opposed the inclusion of wheelchair racers, emphasising that it should remain a running competition and that the inclusion of wheeled racers would lead to accidents and "more disability". The Greater London Council, under the leadership of Ken Livingstone and Illtyd Harrington, threatened to withdraw funding for the event, forcing the organisers to relent and include wheelchair athletes.

Results

Men

Women

Wheelchair men

Wheelchair women

References

Results
Results. Association of Road Racing Statisticians. Retrieved 2020-04-24.
2015 London Marathon Media Guide. London Marathon (2015). Retrieved 2020-04-26.

External links
Official website

1983
London Marathon
Marathon
London Marathon